The , often referred to simply as the Teigeki (帝劇), and previously the Imperial Garden Theater, is a Japanese theater located in Marunouchi, Chiyoda, Tokyo, Japan operated by Toho.

History
Opened in 1911 as the first Western-style theater in Japan, it stages a varied program of musicals and operas. The original structure was rebuilt in 1966 as Toho's "flagship" theater, opening with the premiere of Scaretto, a local adaptation of Gone With the Wind, which drew 380,000 attendees over the course of the theater's first five months of operation.

References

External links
 Website of the Imperial Theatre 

Theatres completed in 1966
Toho
Theatres in Tokyo
1966 establishments in Japan
Buildings and structures in Chiyoda, Tokyo
Marunouchi